Dearest Father. Stories and Other Writings is a collection of writings by Franz Kafka translated by Ernst Kaiser and Eithne Wilkins with notes by Max Brod (Schocken Books, 1954). The title derives from Kafka's Letter to His Father, which begins with this salutation.

Contents
 Wedding Preparations in the Country
 Reflections on Sin, Suffering, Hope, and the True Way
 The Blue Octavo Notebooks
 Letter to His Father
 Fragments from Notebooks and Loose Pages
 Paralipomena (text variants and supplementary literary material)

References 

1954 short story collections
Short story collections by Franz Kafka
Books published posthumously
Schocken Books books